Ana Paula Rodrigues Belo (née Rodrigues; born 18 October 1987) is a Brazilian female handball player for  SCM Craiova and the Brazilian national team.

Achievements
EHF Champions League
Winner: 2016
EHF Cup Winners' Cup
Winner: 2013
EHF Cup
Winner: 2017
Finalist: 2010
Russian Super League
Winner: 2017
Romanian National League:
Winner: 2015, 2016
Romanian Cup:
Finalist: 2015
Austrian League:
Winner: 2012, 2013, 2014
Austrian Cup:
Winner: 2012, 2013, 2014
Pan American Games:
Winner: 2011, 2015
World Championship:
Winner: 2013
Pan American Championship:
Winner: 2011, 2013, 2017
South American Championship:
Winner: 2013
Provident Cup:
Winner: 2013

Individual awards
All-Star Playmaker of the Pan American Championship: 2013
Team of the Tournament Centre Back of the Bucharest Trophy: 2014
Carpathian Trophy Top Scorer: 2015
International Tournament of Spain Top Scorer: 2014
2021 South and Central American Women's Handball Championship: All star team centre back

References

External links

 
 
 

1987 births
Living people
People from São Luís, Maranhão
Brazilian female handball players
Expatriate handball players
Brazilian expatriate sportspeople in Austria
Brazilian expatriate sportspeople in Romania
Brazilian expatriate sportspeople in Russia
Brazilian expatriate sportspeople in Spain
Handball players at the 2008 Summer Olympics
Handball players at the 2012 Summer Olympics
Handball players at the 2016 Summer Olympics
Olympic handball players of Brazil
Handball players at the 2011 Pan American Games
Handball players at the 2015 Pan American Games
Handball players at the 2019 Pan American Games
Pan American Games gold medalists for Brazil
Pan American Games medalists in handball
Medalists at the 2019 Pan American Games
Handball players at the 2020 Summer Olympics
Sportspeople from Maranhão
20th-century Brazilian women
21st-century Brazilian women
Competitors at the 2022 South American Games
South American Games gold medalists for Brazil
South American Games medalists in handball